Suren, also rendered as Sûrên or Soren or Sorena or historically Latinized as Surena, is a given name of Iranian origin, used commonly amongst Iranians and Armenians, and means "strong, the heroic one". 
It may also refer to:

Persons named Suren or Soren
Chihor-Vishnasp Suren, a 6th-century AD governor of Armenia
Walter Surén (1880-1976), German general
Suren Pahlav, 5th-century Iranian nobleman
Surin (Nestorian Patriarch), an 8th-century patriarch of the Church of the East
Suren Shadunts (1898–1938), Soviet-Tajikistani communist leader of Armenian descent
Suren Arakelov (born 1947), Russian mathematician of Armenian descent
Suren Spandaryan (1882–1916), Armenian author and revolutionary
Suren Aghababyan (1922-1986), Armenian literary critic
Suren Yeremian (1908-1992), Armenian historian and cartographer
Suren Nalbandyan (b. 1956), Armenian Greco-Roman wrestler
Soren Sorensen Adams (1879–1963), American inventor 
Suren Markosyan (b. 1984), Armenian Freestyle wrestler
Suren Raghavan, Sri Lankan academic
Suren Spandaryan (1882-1916), Armenian literature critic, publicist and Bolshevik
Soren Thompson (born 1981), American épée fencer
Suren Khachatryan (b. 1956), Armenian politician
Soren Johnson, American game designer

Fictional characters
Soren, fictional character in the 2003 film The Matrix Reloaded
Soren, fictional mage in the 2005 video game Fire Emblem: Path of Radiance
Soren (Guardians of Ga'Hoole), fictional character in the Guardians of Ga'Hoole books by Kathryn Lasky
Soren Lorensen, fictional character in the Charlie and Lola books by Lauren Child
Soren (Underworld), fictional character in the Underworld series of books and films
 Soren, fictional character in the 2004 film The Prince and Me
 Soren the Architect, fictional character on Minecraft: Story Mode
 Suren, fictional character in the book series "La saga de Avalon de Trivia"

Other uses
 Surena (robot), an Iranian humanoid robot, named after the Parthian General Surena
 Surenavan, a town in Armenia
 Samand Soren, a car made by Iran's IKCO car company

See also 
House of Suren, a Parthian noble family in antiquity
Suren toon a species of tree
Søren, a Scandinavian given name
Soren (disambiguation)
Suran (disambiguation)